Bosworth may refer to:

 Battle of Bosworth Field, a battle during the Wars of the Roses in 15th century England

Places

United Kingdom
 Husbands Bosworth, a village in South Leicestershire
 RAF Husbands Bosworth, a World War II aerodrome near Husbands Bosworth
 Market Bosworth, a town near the site of the Battle of Bosworth in south-western Leicestershire
 Bosworth (UK Parliament constituency), in south-western Leicestershire
 Hinckley and Bosworth, a local government district in south-western Leicestershire, originally named Bosworth

North America
 Bosworth, Missouri, a city in Carroll County, Missouri, United States
 Lake Bosworth, Washington, in Snohomish County, Washington, United States
 Mount Bosworth, on the border of Alberta and British Columbia, Canada

People
 Bosworth (surname), a surname and a list of people with the name
 Baron Bosworth, former title for the Duke of Berwick

Given name
 Frank Bosworth Brandegee (1864–1924), United States Representative and Senator from Connecticut
 William Bosworth Castle (1897–1990), American physician and physiologist who transformed hematology
 George Bosworth Churchill (1866–1925), American politician, Representative from Massachusetts, academic, editor
 Louis Bosworth Hurt (1885–1929), English landscape artist
 Stephen Bosworth Pound (1833–1911), pioneer lawyer, senator and judge in Nebraska, USA
 Benjamin Bosworth Smith (1784–1884), American Protestant Episcopal bishop

Other
 Bosworth (game), a board game
 Bosworth Independent College, a boarding school in Northampton, England

See also
 Bosworth Hall (disambiguation), several halls in Leicestershire
 Bosworth fracture, an ankle fracture
 Boeswarthia, a genus of snout moths
 Bosworthia, a genus of alga
 Boxworth, a village in South Cambridgeshire